Divernon Township is located in Sangamon County, Illinois. As of the 2010 census, its population was 1,510 and it contained 677 housing units. Divernon Township formed from Pawnee Township on an unknown date, but before 1921.

Geography

Demographics

References

External links
City-data.com
Illinois State Archives

Townships in Sangamon County, Illinois
Springfield metropolitan area, Illinois
Townships in Illinois